Sogdian may refer to:

 anything pertaining to Sogdia / Sogdiana
 Sogdian language
 Sogdian alphabet
 Sogdian people
 Sogdian (Unicode block)

See also
 Old Sogdian (Unicode block), a separate Unicode block
 Sogdian Rock, a fortress in Sogdia

Language and nationality disambiguation pages